The Embassy of the Sovereign Military Order of Malta in Germany is the diplomatic mission of the Sovereign Military Order of Malta in Germany. The mission is based in Lüdgeweg 1 in Berlin-Charlottenburg. The embassy was opened in October 2001, Ambassador is Augustin Freiherr d’Aboville.

References

Sovereign Military Order of Malta
Germany